Eden Emma Bleazard (1 March 1855 – 13 May 1946) was a visual artist from New Zealand. She won three awards from the Auckland Society of Arts in 1887.

Early life
Bleazard was born in Auckland, New Zealand and the daughter of Robert Bleazard, a merchant. Her sister, Clara Bleazard was also an artist, and growing up they made several trips to Europe together.  Bleazard and her sister were pupils of Alfred Sharpe, whose influence can be seen in Eden's early paintings.

Career
A large watercolor made by Bleazard in 1873 of her family house in Mount Eden provided an early indication of her talent as an artist. She exhibited with the Auckland Society of Arts between 1881 and 1897 and won three first awards from the society, including a prize for design in 1887. Her works include Tara Tara Mountain, Whangaroa Harbor (1884).

References

Further reading 
Artist files for Eden Bleazard are held at:
 Te Aka Matua Research Library, Museum of New Zealand Te Papa Tongarewa
Also see:
 Concise Dictionary of New Zealand Artists McGahey, Kate (2000) Gilt Edge
 Nineteenth Century New Zealand Artists: A Guide and Handbook Platts, Una (1980) Avon Fine Prints

1855 births
1946 deaths
New Zealand painters
New Zealand women artists
People from Auckland
People from Mount Eden
People associated with the Auckland Society of Arts